Janice Tanaka is a Japanese-American media artist born in Hollywood, California[date?]  known for making experimental  videos.  Tanaka is best known for Memories from the Department of Amnesia, an experimental documentary about the death of her mother, and Who's Going to Pay for These Donuts Any, which chronicles the life of her father, who was interned in camps during World War II.

Early life
Tanaka received her Bachelor of Fin degree in 1978 and Master of Fine Arts degree in 1981 from the Art Institute of Chicago. She began her artistic career as a dancer before shifting her focus to film and documentaries. 

Tanaka's parents -- Jack Koto Tanaka and Lily Tanaka -- married prior to World War II.  The family was interned at the Manzanar Japanese Internment Camp during World War II following the signing of Executive Order 9066.  Her father protested the internment, and was arrested by the Federal Bureau of Investigation. After being diagnosed with schizophrenia, he was institutionalized. Lily divorced Jack during the war, and moved the family to a predominantly white neighborhood in Chicago.

Career 
Tanaka started her career as a ballet dancer with the Allegro American Ballet in 1955. In 1957 she performed with the Ballet Russe de Monte Carlo. From 1960 to 1961 she danced with the Jim Hetzer's Japanese Spectacular.  She studied music composition at the Conservatorio International de Musica from 1961 to 1964.

Tanaka has taught[taught what?] at universities around the country.  After receiving her graduate degree from the School of the Art Institute of Chicago, she headed to the University of California, Los Angeles (UCLA) in 1980.  From 1982 to 1985 she was at the Columbia College Chicago.  Between 1985-1989 she attended the University of Colorado Boulder.  After spending 1990 to 1994 at UCLA, she briefly left academia to become CEO of Sonic Boom Inc. until 1996.  Beginning in 1996  and continuing through today (2022) holds a position at the California Institute of the Arts.

K.K. Hallmark[who is this?] describes her work as, "Tanaka's videos are documentary in style, using a variety of techniques; some images are abstract, distorted, and blurred to an unrecognizable degree, while others are clear and informal, as if they could be a family snapshot."

Select videography
Hghlights from Tanaka's work:
 Swimming in Air, 2006, 28:10 minutes, color/B&W, English
 No Hop Sing, No Bruce Lee; What do you do when none of your heroes look like you?, 1998, 31:56 minutes, color/B&W, English
 Who's Going to Pay for These Donuts Anyway?, 1992, 58:30 minutes, color/B&W, English
 Memories From the Department of Amnesia, 1990, 12:50 minutes, color/B&W, English
 The Heisenberg Uncertainty Principle, 1989, 17:50 minutes, color/B&W, English
 Grass or When the Rain Falls on the Water Does The Fish Get Any Wetter?, 1985, 05:30 minutes, color, English
 Superhuman Flights of Submoronic Fancies, 1982, 11:00 minutes, color, English
 Ontogenesis, 1981, 05:30 minutes, color/B&W, English
 A True-Life Adventure in Beaver Valley, 1980, 05:30 minutes, color/B&W, English

Permanent collections
Tanaka has pieces in the collections of many museums and libraries.
 Kröller-Müller Museum
 Carnegie Museum of Art
 The Getty
 The Japanese American National Museum California
 The Institute of Kino Engineers (St. Petersburg, Russia)
 National Library of Australia
 The New York Public Library
 The University of Southern California
 University of California Los Angeles
 New York University
 University of Chicago.

Awards
Tanaka has received many awards:
 The American Film Institute Media Award
 The National Endowment for the Arts Media Award
 The Corporation for Public Broadcasting and Public Broadcasting Systems Media Awards
 Rockefeller Foundation Media Fellowship (1991 and 2003)

References

External links
 Archive Grid (Tanaka's works held in archives, libraries, museums and historical societies).

American artists of Japanese descent
Japanese-American internees
Women video artists
School of the Art Institute of Chicago alumni